Wind power in Russia has a long history of small-scale use, but the country has not yet developed large-scale commercial wind energy production. 
Most of its current limited wind production is located in agricultural areas with low population densities, where connection to the main energy grid is difficult. 
By 2018, Russia had a total installed wind capacity of 106 MW, a nearly ten-fold increase over 2016 but still a tiny share of the country’s potential.

Russia is estimated to have a total potential of 80,000 TWh/yr for wind energy, 6,218 TWh/yr of which is economically feasible. 
This low population density means that there is little existing electricity infrastructure currently in place, which hinders development of these resources. 

Current Russian wind energy projects have a combined capacity of over 1,700 MW, although less than 17 MW had been installed as of the end of 2010. 
The Russian Wind Energy Association predicts that if Russia achieves its goal of having 4.5% of its energy come from renewable sources by 2020, the country will have a total wind capacity of 7,000 MW.

In 2010, plans for the construction of a wind power plant in Yeisk, on the Sea of Azov, were announced. 
It is expected to initially have a capacity of 50 MW, which will become 100 MW a year later. German engineering company Siemens announced in July 2010, following a visit to Russia by Chancellor Angela Merkel, that it would build wind power plants in Russia. 
By 2015, the company hoped to install 1,250 MW of capacity in Russia. As of 2015, capacity was only 15.4 MW.

History 

The first experimental wind power plant (3.5 kW) in the Soviet Union was built in 1931 in Kursk by the project of engineers Ufimtsev and Vetchinkin. To conserve energy during calm winds, a 328 kg flywheel contained in a vacuum chamber was used. The wind generator provided electricity to Ufimtsev's house, including a workshop with machine tools, and also illuminated several other houses along the Semenovskaya street. For more details, see article in Russian wiki.

The experimental wind farm in Balaclava (in Crimea) with capacity of 100 kW was developed under direction of inventor Yuri Kondratyuk and installed there in 1931. Before the war, it produced electricity for the Balaclava-Sevastopol tramline. During the war it was destroyed. 

From 1932 Kondratyuk, together with Nikolai Nikitin, worked on a design of 165-metre high reinforced concrete mast on the Bedene-Kir plateau, four kilometers north of the peak of windy mountain Ai-Petri in Crimea. It was expected to produce up to 24 MW of power. After the death of project sponsor Sergo Ordzhonikidze in 1937 the project was reduced in scale and in 1938 the construction stopped forever.

57 wind turbines are being built 80 kilometres northeast of Murmansk, at the Kolskaya Wind Farm. The farm is expected to be operational in 2021.

List of wind farms

See also
Renewable energy in Russia
Geothermal power in Russia
Wind power
Renewable energy by country

References

External links
Russian Association of Wind Power Industry
 = Germany's FWT to supply 51MW Russian site =